Hans-Otto Schumacher (born 17 February 1950 in Grevenbroich) is a former West German slalom canoeist who competed in the 1970s. He won a silver medal in the C-2 event at the 1972 Summer Olympics in Munich.

Schumacher also won two medals at the 1973 ICF Canoe Slalom World Championships in Muotathal with a gold in the C-2 team event and a bronze in the C-2 event.

References

1950 births
Canoeists at the 1972 Summer Olympics
German male canoeists
Living people
Olympic canoeists of West Germany
Olympic silver medalists for West Germany
Olympic medalists in canoeing
Medalists at the 1972 Summer Olympics
Medalists at the ICF Canoe Slalom World Championships